World Class Baseball is a baseball video game originally released for the NEC PC Engine in 1988. It was re-released for the Wii Virtual Console service in North America on September 17, 2007, and in PAL regions on September 21, 2007.

Gameplay 
World Class Baseball features 12 teams that must be defeated in the single player Pennant Mode, a knockout competition. Upon defeating all teams, the player faces off against the Turbo Tigers, a non-player selectable team of all-stars. The game also gives the option for players to compete in a one or two player versus exhibition game, or to watch two computer controlled teams play each other.

Teams 
 Turbo Tigers (Hudson Bees in Japanese version)

Reception 

In November 1993, Famitsu magazine's Reader Cross Review gave the game a 5 out of 10.

References

External links

 World Class Baseball at GameFAQs
 World Class Baseball at Giant Bomb
 World Class Baseball at MobyGames

1988 video games
Baseball video games
Hudson Soft games
X68000 games
Multiplayer and single-player video games
TurboGrafx-16 games
Video games developed in Japan
Virtual Console games